Qaleh Gardan (also Romanized as Qal‘eh Gardan) is a village in Rahimabad Rural District, Rahimabad District, Rudsar County, Gilan Province, Iran. At the 2006 census, its population was 197, in 43 families.

References 

Populated places in Rudsar County